Sci Fi in Serbia was launched on October 1, 2009, specializing in science fiction, fantasy and horror shows and movies. It is distributed via cable, Sci Fi Channel became Sci Fi Universal on October 14, 2010.

Sci Fi Serbia is the same channel as Sci Fi Poland, only with Serbian subtitles.

Programming

Current

Angel
Battlestar Galactica
Buffy the Vampire Slayer
Charmed
Dark Angel
Day of the Dead
Dead Like Me
Eden Of The East
Eureka
Firefly
Futurama
Flash Gordon
Grimm
Hercules: The Legendary Journeys
Legacies
Legend of the Seeker
Legends of Tomorrow
Limetown
Quantum Leap
Spides
Stargate Atlantis
Stargate SG-1
Stargate Universe
Star Trek: Enterprise
Travelers
Vagrant Queen
Warehouse 13
Wynonna Earp
Xena: Warrior Princess

Movie Block

References

External links

Syfy
Television stations in Serbia
Television channels and stations established in 2009
Science fiction television channels
2009 establishments in Serbia